Austin Powers in Goldmember is a 2002 American spy comedy film directed by Jay Roach. It is the third installment in the Austin Powers film series and stars Mike Myers in four roles:  Austin Powers, Dr. Evil, Goldmember, and Fat Bastard. Myers and Michael McCullers co-wrote the screenplay, which also features co-star Beyoncé Knowles in her theatrical film debut, as well as Robert Wagner, Seth Green, Michael York, Verne Troyer, Michael Caine, Mindy Sterling and Fred Savage.

Goldmember is a loose parody of the James Bond films Goldfinger and You Only Live Twice, also incorporating elements of Live and Let Die, The Man with the Golden Gun, The Spy Who Loved Me and GoldenEye. It opens with a self-parody of the Austin Powers film series called Austinpussy, where Austin Powers is featured in a bio-pic parody of the James Bond film Octopussy. The self-parody is directed by Steven Spielberg and stars Tom Cruise as Austin Powers, Gwyneth Paltrow as Dixie Normous, Kevin Spacey as Dr. Evil, Danny Devito as Mini-Me, and John Travolta as Goldmember.

The film was distributed by New Line Cinema and released in the United States on July 26, 2002. Goldmember finished its box office run with an international haul of $296.6 million. A fourth film in the series has been considered since Goldmembers release, but has yet to enter production as of 2023.

Plot

In 2002, from his lair behind the Hollywood Sign, Dr. Evil unveils to Number 2, Mini-Me, Frau Farbissina, and Scott Evil that his plan for world domination is to travel back in time to 1975 and partner with the Dutch, gold-obsessed Johann van der Smut, who after losing his genitalia in a smelting accident, is known by the alias "Goldmember". Goldmember developed a power unit for a tractor beam which Dr. Evil names "Preparation H" and he intends to use it to pull a meteor into the earth. Austin Powers is on his way to watch a movie about his life, and the Ministry of Defence invades the lair and arrest Dr. Evil and Mini-Me. Queen Elizabeth II knights Austin for his service, but Austin is disappointed when his father, the famous spy Nigel Powers, does not attend the event. During an after party, Basil Exposition informs Austin that Nigel has been kidnapped and the only clue is that the crew of his yacht have had their genitalia painted gold.

Austin seeks Dr. Evil's help to find the culprit, but the imprisoned Dr. Evil antagonizes Austin by reminding him that his father was also absent when he was given the title of "International Man of Mystery" during their British Intelligence academy graduation, an event that angered Dr. Evil due to him being the top of the class. He eventually tells him that Goldmember is behind the abduction so Austin time travels to 1975 and infiltrates Goldmember's roller disco club. He is reunited with his former lover, FBI agent Foxxy Cleopatra, who is undercover. Austin locates his father but is unable to rescue him and Goldmember takes Nigel through Dr. Evil's time machine to 2002. Dr. Evil and Mini-Me instigate a riot in their prison, allowing them to escape. A British Intelligence mole named Number 3 informs Austin that Dr. Evil has moved to a new lair near Tokyo.

Austin, accompanied by Foxxy, travels to Tokyo and they confront Fat Bastard, who is now a Sumo wrestler. Fat Bastard reveals that businessman Mr. Roboto is working on a device for Dr. Evil and Goldmember. Austin and Foxxy meet with Roboto, who pleads ignorance. Austin and Foxxy infiltrate Roboto's factory where the command unit for the tractor beam is being loaded in Goldmember's car, and Roboto gives Goldmember a golden key needed to activate the beam. Foxxy confronts Goldmember while Austin attempts to free Nigel, but Goldmember escapes and flees to Dr. Evil's submarine. Scott Evil presents Dr. Evil with sharks with laser beams attached to their heads, a request that had gone unfulfilled previously. Roboto then dies when Scott causes him to fall into the shark pool. Dr. Evil replaces Mini-Me with Scott as his favored son and the rejected clone defects and joins Austin and Foxxy.

The trio infiltrate the submarine but Austin is captured. Dr. Evil prepares to activate the tractor beam, but Foxxy steals the key and frees Austin. Austin prepares to shoot Dr. Evil, when Nigel appears and reveals that Austin and Dr. Evil are actually brothers. Confused, Dr. Evil explains that his parents died in a car accident and he was brought up by evil Belgians, but Nigel reveals that the explosion came from an assassination attempt and he thought that only Austin survived. Dr. Evil (revealed to be named Dougie), Austin, Nigel, and Mini-Me embrace; enraging Scott, who leaves to pursue his own vengeance while Goldmember commandeers the tractor beam's controls, unzipping his trousers to reveal his gold-covered genitalia to be a spare key. Goldmember activates the tractor beam, but Austin and Dr. Evil work together to reverse its polarity, destroying the meteor and saving the world.

Goldmember turns to the camera to reveal the entire story was adapted into a film called Austinpussy and was directed by Steven Spielberg, starring Tom Cruise as Austin, Kevin Spacey as Dr. Evil, Danny DeVito as Mini-Me, and John Travolta as Goldmember. Upon exiting the cinema, Austin and Foxxy encounter Fat Bastard, now thin but with sagging flesh thanks to the Subway diet. As Austin and Foxxy kiss, Scott Evil – now completely bald, dressed and behaving as his father, declares he will get his revenge against Austin before dancing like Michael Jackson. During the end credits, Mini-Me talks with Britney Spears, and she asks him if she can give him her phone number.

Cast
 Mike Myers as Austin Powers, a British agent from the 60s and Dr. Evil's long lost younger brother who was frozen for 30 years to stop Dr. Evil.
 Aaron Himelstein as young Austin Powers
 Myers' other roles in the film include:
 Dr. Evil, a Belgian supervillain and Austin Powers’ nemesis and long lost older brother. During the film's climax, he redeems himself and makes amends with Austin Powers.
 Josh Zuckerman as young Dr. Evil
 Goldmember (born Johann van der Smut), a gold-hungry Dutch supervillain, ally of Dr. Evil and the main antagonist of the film.
 Fat Bastard, an obese Scottish former Ministry of Defence soldier who now works as a Japanese sumo wrestler.
 Beyoncé Knowles as Foxxy Cleopatra, Austin's new sidekick and Goldmember's rival
 Michael York as Basil Exposition, Austin's boss
 Eddie Adams as young Basil Exposition
 Michael Caine as Nigel Powers a British agent and Austin and Dr. Evil's father
 Scott Aukerman as young Nigel Powers
 Robert Wagner as Number 2, Dr. Evil's henchman
 Rob Lowe as Middle Number 2
 Evan Farmer as Young Number 2
 Seth Green as Scott Evil, Dr. Evil's son
 Verne Troyer as Mini-Me, Dr. Evil's mini clone who is jealous of Scott.
 Mindy Sterling as Frau Farbissina, Dr. Evil's loud-mouthed henchwoman from Germany. 
 Fred Savage as Number Three / Mole
 Brian Tee as Godzilla Pedestrian
 Masi Oka as Godzilla Copyright Pedestrian
 Clint Howard as Radar Operator Johnson Ritter
 Michael McDonald as Royal Guard
 Donna D'Errico as Female Vendor
 Fred Stoller as Melon Guy
 Greg Grunberg as the shirtless fan with the letter "T" (Greg's brother Brad Grunberg is the fan with the "A")
 Kinga Philipps as Mrs. Powers
 Kevin Stea as Assistant Director of "Austinpussy" / Dancer
 Anna-Marie Goddard, Nina Kaczorowski, and Nikki Ziering as henchwomen
 Ming Tea as Themselves
 Rachel Roberts as The Model
 Susanna Hoffs as Gillian Shagwell
 Matthew Sweet as Sid Belvedere
 Christopher Ward as Trevor Algberth
 Carrie Ann Inaba as Fook Yu
 Diane Mizota as Fook Mi
 Tom Lister Jr. as Prisoner #2
 Kristen Johnston as Dancer at Austin's pad
 Neil Mullarkey as Physician
 Nobu Matsuhisa as Mr. Roboto
 Peter Tuiasosopo as Sumo Wrestler with Beard
 Jeannette Charles as Queen Elizabeth II
 Perry Caravello (extra)

Cameos
 Tom Cruise as Himself as Austin Powers (During Austinpussy)
 Danny DeVito as Himself as Mini-Me (During Austinpussy)
 Gwyneth Paltrow as Herself as Dixie Normous (During Austinpussy)
 Kevin Spacey as Himself as Dr. Evil (During Austinpussy)
 Steven Spielberg as Himself
 Quincy Jones as Himself
 John Travolta as Himself as Goldmember (During the Austinpussy ending)
 Britney Spears as a Fembot version of Herself (During the opening credits) (During the "Boys" music video) and as Herself talking with Mini-Me (During the end credits)
 Ozzy Osbourne as Himself
 Sharon Osbourne as Herself
 Kelly Osbourne as Herself
 Jack Osbourne as Himself
 Willie Nelson as Himself
 Burt Bacharach (During the end credits) as Himself
 Nathan Lane as Mysterious Disco Man (Non-Speaking Role)
 Spencer Kayden as Jenny
 Katie Couric as Georgia State Prison guard

Production

Title concerns
The title of the film, Goldmember, led to legal action being taken by MGM, the distributors of the James Bond film franchise, that briefly led to the film's title being removed from promotional material and trailers. Several potential replacement titles were prepared, including License to Shag, Live and Let Shag, You Only Shag Thrice and Never Say Member Again. The dispute was quickly resolved and the film title remained unchanged on the provision that the film would include trailers in its cinema releases for the then-upcoming James Bond film, Die Another Day, and The Lord of the Rings: The Two Towers.

Characters
Austin Powers (Myers), having conquered the 1990s and the 1960s, travels back to the 1970s and teams up with his nemesis Dr. Evil (also played by Myers) to thwart a new villain, Goldmember (Myers once again). Myers also plays Fat Bastard for the second time, this time parodying the kind of "wire fight" seen in Crouching Tiger, Hidden Dragon. The film also stars Beyoncé Knowles as Foxxy Cleopatra (parodying blaxploitation heroines, primarily Foxy Brown and Cleopatra Jones, as well as Christie Love when she says, "You're under arrest, sugah!"), Michael York, reprising the role of Basil Exposition, and Verne Troyer in his second appearance as Mini-Me. The film also introduced a new character named Number 3 (a.k.a. the Mole), who is portrayed by former child star Fred Savage. Clint Howard plays a radar operator in all three films. Michael Caine guest stars as Austin's father, Nigel; this role was inspired by the character of Harry Palmer from The Ipcress File, a 1965 film starring Caine. Sean Connery was originally considered for the role of Nigel Powers and Honor Blackman for that of Mrs. Powers.

Four actors who appeared in the earlier films play different characters in Goldmember. Rob Lowe, who played the friend of a dead guard in International Man of Mystery, reprises his role as a younger Number 2 from The Spy Who Shagged Me, while Neil Mullarkey (quartermaster clerk in International Man of Mystery) and Eric Winzenried (army private soldier in The Spy Who Shagged Me) appear as the Physician and Henchman Sailor in the Sick Bay. Michael McDonald (the Virtucon guard who got run over by a steamroller in International Man of Mystery and a NATO soldier in The Spy Who Shagged Me) appears as the royal guard.

Goldmember
Johann van der Smut, better known as Goldmember, is a fictional villain played by Myers (John Travolta plays the character in a cameo at the end of the film). The name was inspired by the James Bond villain Auric Goldfinger. Goldmember's Dutch origins and character traits were, according to Myers, inspired by an episode of the HBO TV series Real Sex featuring a Dutchman who operated a "sex barn" north of Rotterdam. The man's distinct forms of expression caught Myers' attention while he was writing.

Release

Box office
Austin Powers in Goldmember took in £6,364,796 in the United Kingdom on its opening weekend. In the United States, it broke the opening weekend record for a spoof movie, surpassing the previous Austin Powers films. It grossed $73.1 million during its opening weekend, surpassing 2001's Planet of the Apes for the biggest July opening of all time. The latter record would be held for two years until Spider-Man 2 took it in 2004. The film also surpassed New Line's Rush Hour 2 as the biggest opening for a comedy film. This was the fourth-highest opening weekend of all time, behind Star Wars: Episode II – Attack of the Clones, Harry Potter and the Sorcerer's Stone and Spider-Man. The film grossed a total of $213 million in the United States, according to Box Office Mojo.

Home media
Austin Powers in Goldmember was released on VHS and DVD on December 3, 2002. The DVD was released under the Infinifilm label, and was re-packed in 2011 as part of the Austin Powers 3 Film Collection. The film debuted on Blu-ray for the first time on December 2, 2008 in a three-film collection with its predecessors.

Critical reception
On Rotten Tomatoes, the film has an approval rating of 53% based on 186 reviews, with an average rating of 5.8/10. The site's critical consensus reads, "While the narrative structure is messy and doesn't make much sense, the third installment of the Austin Powers franchise contains enough inspired bits to entertain." On Metacritic, the film has a weighted average score of 62 out of 100, based on 34 critics, indicating "generally favorable reviews". Audiences polled by CinemaScore gave the film an average grade of "B+" on an A+ to F scale.

Myers was nominated for the MTV Movie Award for Best Villain for the third time, but lost against Daveigh Chase for her role as Samara Morgan in The Ring, making it the first time Myers lost the award. However, he did win the award for Best Comedic Performance, making it the first time he won the award, having previously lost twice for the first two films.

Awards

Soundtrack

The song "Hey Goldmember" interpolates and is a parody of four 1970s disco songs formed into a medley; "Sing a Song" by Earth, Wind & Fire, "Get Down Tonight", "(Shake, Shake, Shake) Shake Your Booty", and "That's the Way (I Like It)", all by KC and the Sunshine Band.

Track listing
 "Work It Out" – Beyoncé
 "Miss You" (Dr. Dre Remix 2002) – The Rolling Stones
 "Boys" (Co-Ed Remix) – Britney Spears featuring Pharrell Williams
 "Groove Me" – Angie Stone
 "Shining Star" – Earth, Wind & Fire
 "Hey Goldmember" – Foxxy Cleopatra featuring Devin Vasquez and Solange (samples "(Shake, Shake, Shake) Shake Your Booty" by KC and the Sunshine Band)
 "Ain't No Mystery" – Smash Mouth
 "Evil Woman" – Soul Hooligan featuring Diana King
 "1975" – Paul Oakenfold (samples "A Fifth of Beethoven" by Walter Murphy)
 "Hard Knock Life (Ghetto Anthem)" (Dr. Evil Remix) – Dr. Evil
 "Daddy Wasn't There" – Ming Tea featuring Austin Powers
 "Alfie (What's It All About, Austin?)" – Susanna Hoffs

Weekly charts

Year-end charts

Possible sequel
In October 2005, in an interview with Entertainment Weekly, Mike Myers discussed the possibility of studio sources moving forward with a fourth film. "There is hope!". "We're all circling and talking to each other. I miss doing the characters." In May 2007, in an interview with IGN, "So no more Austin Powers?" was asked, and Myers replied, "No, no, there is a fully conceived idea for a fourth and I can just say that it's from Dr. Evil's point of view. So if you balanced how much of it was Austin with Dr. Evil, it's more about Dr. Evil than Austin". Also, in the audio commentary from the DVD release of Goldmember, Myers revealed that in the fourth film, Fat Bastard would return and regain the weight that he lost in Goldmember.

In May 2007, at the Shrek the Third premiere, Mike Myers announced that a fourth Austin Powers film was planned, but that it would focus more on Dr. Evil rather than Austin. He also said that he'd start work on it after he started work on The Love Guru, which became a box office bomb. In February 2008, it was announced that Jay Roach would return as director. In April 2008, it was reported that Gisele Bündchen had been offered a role in the film. However, Seth Green, who played Scott Evil, stated that there was no script at the moment and that Austin Powers 4 would be made if a script is written and approved. In June 2008, when asked about another Austin Powers film in an interview, Myers stated, "I have an idea, and again it's one of those things that will emerge or it won't." In July 2008, Mike Myers stated that he had begun writing Austin Powers 4, and that the plot is "really about Dr. Evil and his son."

In March 2010, Jay Roach indicated to MTV that Myers is working on ideas for a fourth film. In August 2011, Mike Myers revealed he would return, and had begun writing a script for a fourth installment. In September 2013, when asked about the future of Austin Powers, Myers answered "I'm still figuring that out." In September 2015, Verne Troyer expressed his desire to return as Mini-Me if he was asked to do so.

In May 2016, Roach was asked about the fourth Austin Powers film during an interview with Larry King, and he stated the ideas for the fourth film that he and Myers have are good and interesting. In August 2016, in a telephone interview, Mike Myers stated "Everything is being negotiated and worked out and all that stuff" in regards to the fourth installment of the Austin Powers film series.

In April 2017, as the twentieth anniversary approached for Austin Powers: International Man of Mystery, Mike Myers claimed he would love to do another Austin Powers film, but audiences would "just have to see". Two days later, Roach stated that a fourth film would only occur if Myers creates a good story for it. In May 2017, Troyer stated that Mini-Me will reveal that he can speak in the fourth movie. However, Troyer's death on 21 April 2018 delayed the production of a fourth film and prevented him from reprising his role as Mini-Me. In May 2018, Myers reiterated his interest in making a fourth Austin Powers, stating that it would be fun, also hinting that some tribute to Troyer might be included. In November 2018, Myers stated that the project's future is "looking good" with the script already written and that Austin Powers and Dr. Evil will return soon, citing his parenthood as the reason for how long the production has lasted and that Roach will most likely reprise his directorial duties.

In January 2020, Jay Roach again indicated that he was interested in doing a fourth film.

See also
 Outline of James Bond

References

External links

 
 
 
 

3
2002 comedy films
2002 films
2002 action comedy films
2000s parody films
2000s spy comedy films
American action comedy films
American parody films
American robot films
American sequel films
American spy comedy films
Android (robot) films
Cultural depictions of Britney Spears
Cultural depictions of Ozzy Osbourne
Disco films
Films about time travel
Films about twin brothers
Films directed by Jay Roach
Films produced by Demi Moore
Films produced by Suzanne Todd
Films scored by George S. Clinton
Films set in the 1970s
Films set in 1975
Films set in 2002
Films set in Guam
Films set in London
Films set in Tokyo
Films shot in Hertfordshire
Films shot in London
Films shot in Los Angeles
Films shot in Nevada
Films shot in Utah
Films with screenplays by Michael McCullers
Films with screenplays by Mike Myers
Japan in non-Japanese culture
New Line Cinema films
Self-reflexive films
Submarine films
Films about father–son relationships
2000s English-language films
2000s American films